"Sunshine, Lollipops and Rainbows" is a popular song sung by Lesley Gore. It was originally released on Gore's 1963 album Lesley Gore Sings of Mixed-Up Hearts. Composed by Marvin Hamlisch, the single was released in conjunction with Gore's rendition in the 1965 film Ski Party. It was arranged by Claus Ogerman and produced by Quincy Jones. The tune peaked at No.13 on the Billboard Hot 100.  Billboard said of the single that "back on the happy rhythm trail, Lesley comes up with a winner in this summertime rouser."  Cash Box described it as "an engaging lovey-dovey, a perfect way for teeners to get in the summertime spirit."

The single version released in 1965 was sped up while the album version was played back at normal speed.

Personnel
Lesley Gore - vocals

Popular culture
The song's movie debut was in the 1965 film Ski Party.
Used as a gag in a popular Flash series in the UK, Eddsworld, in which one character, Tord, has a particular hate for this song, most notably in "Hello Hellhole," and "Ruined."
It was used in the 2009 film Cloudy with a Chance of Meatballs during the montage of Flint making food for the townspeople (in this version, the song has one more key change at the end and goes faster).
Alvin and the Chipmunks included it on the 1965 album Chipmunks à Go-Go.
Dusty Springfield never recorded the song for an album, but performed it once on TV, on the October 2, 1965 episode of BBC1's The Billy Cotton Band Show in the UK.
It appeared in The Simpsons episode, "Marge on the Lam" (4 November 1993). In this episode, it is lower in pitch than usual.
The song has become the celebratory anthem for a Texas Rangers fan community on Reddit.
It appeared in season 11 of America's Got Talent series when Ryan Stock and Amber Lynn Walker performed a stunt act on the stage set as a ‘50s TV show.
The Umbrella Academy included it in a scene in season 1, episode 9, in which Hazel was having a scuffle with Cha-Cha to save Agnes.
The song also appeared in the 2019 TV series, Green Eggs & Ham.
It is played during a Serious Sam Fusion 2017 (beta) promo video from Croteam on the Steam platform.
The song was used as the theme song to "Vacation Time," on CBC television from 1965 to 1968.  This was a summer replacement series that ran from 1962 until 1968.
An instrumental segment was featured on the hit NBC 1977 television series, CHiPs second episode called Undertow which had aired on September 22, 1977.
At full volume, Christy Plunkett (Anna Faris) happily sings along to it while driving in the 2018 Mom episode "Push-Down Coffee And A Working Turn Signal" (Season 5, Episode 12). As the song plays, the engine sputters and finally the car dies.

References

Lesley Gore songs
1965 singles
1963 songs
Song recordings produced by Quincy Jones
Mercury Records singles
Songs written by Marvin Hamlisch